Dermatocarpon leptophyllodes is a species of lichen belonging to the family Verrucariaceae.

References

Verrucariales 
Lichen species
Lichens described in 1922